Solem v. Bartlett, 465 U.S. 463 (1984), was a United States Supreme Court case involving Indian country jurisdiction in the United States that decided that opening up reservation lands for settlement by non-Indians does not constitute the intent to diminish reservation boundaries.  Therefore, reservation boundaries would not be diminished unless specifically determined through acts of Congress.

Background 
The Cheyenne River Act of 1908 gave the Secretary of Interior power “to sell and dispose of”  of the Cheyenne River Sioux reservation to non-Indians for settlement.  The profit of the sale was to go to the United States Treasury as a “credit” for the Indians to have tribal rights on the reservation (465 U.S. 463).

In 1979, Sioux tribe member John Bartlett was charged by the State of South Dakota with attempted rape.  The crime had occurred on the area of the reservation that had been opened to settlement in 1908 with Cheyenne River Act (465 U. S. 465).  Bartlett pleaded guilty and was sentenced to ten years in a state penitentiary, but contended that his crime actually took place in Indian country because the Act did not reduce the reservation but instead only opened it to settlement, therefore the jurisdiction belonged to the tribe, not the state (465 U.S. 465).

Opinion of the Court 
The Court recognized that large areas in the west had been set aside as Indian reservations in the late 19th century, and that later, individual allotments were designated to Indians, with the excess land being sold to non-Indians.  The Cheyenne River Act was a piece of legislation that dealt specifically with the excess land from the Cheyenne Sioux Reservation, and has its own statutory language.  Usually, States held jurisdiction over unallotted open lands when the Act declared that the area is no longer considered reservation land.  Otherwise, federal, state, and tribal authorities share jurisdiction of the open area.  The Court stated that designated reservation land remains a part of the reservation until Congress clearly diminishes its boundaries.

The Court held that the Act only gives the Secretary of State permission to “sell and dispose” of lands, not to diminish the reservation boundaries (465 U.S. 466). Therefore, the Cheyenne River Sioux reservation was not diminished by the Act and the area on which Bartlett committed his crime was within Indian country jurisdiction.

The ruling in Solem v. Bartlett established three principles to measure Congress’s intent to diminish a reservation.

First, only Congress has the power to diminish reservation boundaries. In Solem, it is stated that “once a block of land is set aside for an Indian reservation and no matter what happens to the title of the individual plots within the area, the entire block retains its reservation status until Congress explicitly states otherwise”. Therefore, the allotment policy does not designate a change in reservation boundaries.

It is also stated that the intent to diminish will not be lightly inferred by a federal court. Since only Congress has the power to diminish a reservation and the allotment policy never eliminated reservations, the language of any surplus land acts must specifically state the intent to diminish a reservation or make a blatant statement from which the intent to diminished is presumed.

Other factors can also determine whether reservation lands have been reduced by an act, such as the legislative history.  For example, subsequent treatment of the land by Congress can specify whether the land is still considered a part of the reservation or not. If the treatment of an area strongly suggests that Congress or other governmental groups view the reservation land as diminished, yet there is no specific statutory language deeming it so, it can still be considered reduced. However, when both the Act and the legislative history are unsuccessful in providing proof that supports the idea of diminishment, the court holds that the reservation is not diminished

Subsequent developments 
The important precedents set in the decision, Solem v. Bartlett, were heavily relied upon later on to decide two other cases involving Indian country jurisdiction.  In Hagen v. Utah, the court, using the factors determined in Solem, upheld that Congress had intentionally diminished tribal lands with surplus land acts in the Uintah Reservation. The court determined that the specific language in Hagen, which addressed that the excess lands “be restored to the public domain” clearly indicated that the land was not to remain reservation land as in Solem, but instead reduce the boundaries of the reservation. In another similar case, South Dakota v. Yankton Sioux Tribe, the court echoed similar sentiments, stating that Congress used clear statutory language to diminish the boundaries of the Yankton Sioux Reservation and that the agreement to pay for these lands further supported that they had been ceded through the statute.

The tests of Solem as to whether Congress has property disestablished the reservation boundary, arose in Sharp v. Murphy, a case involving the reservations of the Five Civilized Tribes that cover most of the eastern half of the state of Oklahoma, as to whether to determine if a person accused of murder should be under jurisdiction of the state if the reservations were disestablished or the federal system otherwise. The United States Court of Appeals for the Tenth Circuit used Solem to find that Congress did not explicitly disestablish these reservations,. The decision of the Appeals Court was upheld by the United States Supreme in light of that courts judgement in McGirt v. Oklahoma (2020). This means that Patrick Murphy could be retried in federal court.

References

External links
 

United States Supreme Court cases
United States Supreme Court cases of the Burger Court
United States federal Indian policy
United States Native American case law
1984 in United States case law
Sioux